The 2015 San Angelo Bandits season was the team's third season as a professional indoor football franchise, third as the "San Angelo Bandits", and first as a member of Champions Indoor Football (CIF). The Bandits were led by head coach Wendell Davis.

The Bandits were the 2014 champions of the Lone Star Football League, the last before the LSFL merged with the Champions Professional Indoor Football League and several other teams to form Champions Indoor Football. One of nine teams in the CIF for the 2015 season, the Bandits played their home games at Foster Communications Coliseum in San Angelo, Texas.

Season summary
The Bandits' announced schedule for the 2015 season was affected when the New Mexico Stars abruptly postponed their entry into the league on February 21, just one week before the season began. On March 3, the Albuquerque-based Duke City Gladiators were announced as a late entry into the league, partially replacing the Stars in the CIF schedule with a plan to play 11 games in 2015. The Gladiators simply replaced the Stars on the Bandits' schedule for two home games and one road game.

Just one season after San Angelo won the LSFL championship, the Bandits found themselves in a new league and an unfamiliar position as underdogs. The team lost its first 5 games as a CIF franchise under the leadership of new head coach Joey Longoria. He was replaced as head coach by former Dallas Cowboys player and recently released Texas Revolution head coach Wendell Davis. Longoria was demoted to defensive coordinator and offensive coordinator Gabe Carillo was released.  Davis led the Bandits to their first win of the season by defeating the Revolution in San Angelo but decisively lost the next weekend's matchup against the Revolution at the Allen Event Center. This was followed by a home defeat by the Duke City Gladiators, another road loss to Texas, and a home-season ending loss to Duke City. The May 30 road game against the Salina Bombers was cancelled when that team abruptly folded on May 28.

Awards and honors
Each week of the regular season, the CIF names league-wide Players of the Week in offensive, defensive, and special teams categories. For Week 3, the CIF named defensive back Darrelle Charlo as the Defensive Player of the Week. For Week 8, the CIF named kick returner Darrell Harkless as one of two Special Teams Players of the Week.

Schedule
Key:

Regular season

 Rescheduled after the New Mexico Stars withdrew from the league on February 22, 2015.
 Game cancelled after Salina Bombers ejected from league on May 28, 2015.

Roster

Standings

Playoffs

References

External links
San Angelo Bandits official website
San Angelo Bandits at Our Sports Central

San Angelo Bandits
San Angelo Bandits